Förste Sergeant (First Sergeant) is a Swedish military rank above Sergeant (Sweden) and below Fanjunkare. First Sergeant is an entry or transitional level professional rank awarded after a minimum of 6 months of basic training followed by 18 months (3 semesters) of professional training. A typical role of a First Sergeant is to act as a section commander of 6-12 men or platoon 2 I/C. Corresponding ranks in the Navy are Förste styrman, Förste maskinist, and Förste konstapel.

Obtaining the rank in Sweden 
Short route: Three months of Basic Military Training (GMU), three months of Extended Military Training (KMU) followed by 18 months of professional specialist training.

Long route: Minimum of 4 years of service (usually longer) in the junior ranks of which 2 years must be in the billet of OR-4/5. Followed by 40-60 weeks of specialist training/validation.

History and related ranks

Sweden: 2008 
The rank was introduced as a professional rank.

Sweden: June 6, 2008 
First cadre of 92 Army Specialist Officers graduated as Sergeants from the Land Warfare Center at Kvarn. Those have received training to become squadleaders and will serve as instructors at training centers around Sweden.  Those sergeants were promoted to this rank in January 2009.

See also 
 Military ranks of the Swedish Armed Forces
 Swedish Armed Forces
 Officer Training
 Classification of military personnel in international operations

References

Military ranks of Sweden
Military insignia
Military ranks of the Swedish Army